Céline Condorelli (born 1974) is an artist who works between London and Milan and is best known for her publications The Company She Keeps and Support Structures and her artworks which work across the spheres of art and architecture. Support Structures was a co-publication with Gavin Wade (Director of Eastside Projects). She was shortlisted for the Max Mara Art Prize for Women in 2017.

Her work spans architecture and art, exploring relationships, mechanisms and structures which often go unnoticed.

Education 
Condorelli received her PhD in Research Architecture from Goldsmiths College, London, England, 2013. Prior to this she completed an MA in History and Theory of Architecture, University of East London, London, England, 2000. Before which, she achieved her RIBA part 2 and diploma from the Architectural Association School of Architecture, London, England, 1999 and her RIBA part 1 and degree from the Architectural Association School of Architecture, London, England, 1995.

Work 
She is co-founder of Eastside Projects in Birmingham and is currently Professor at NABA (Nuova Accademia di Belle Arti) Milan in the MA in Visual Arts and Curatorial Studies.

She has also been external examiner at Chelsea College of Art & Design (2009-1014) and was senior lecturer at London Metropolitan University School of Architecture and Spatial Design. She has delivered talks and presentations across the globe, including: the Chisenhale Gallery, the Serpentine gallery, the Tate Modern, The Showroom, London; IASPIS, Stockholm.

References 

Living people
Italian contemporary artists
Italian women artists
1974 births
Alumni of Goldsmiths, University of London
Alumni of the University of East London
Alumni of the Architectural Association School of Architecture